Theo McFarland (born 16 October 1995 in Samoa) is a Samoan rugby union player who plays for  in Premiership Rugby. His playing position is lock or flanker. He signed for Saracens in August 2021, having played rugby in Samoa and training with the Samoa Sevens team. McFarland was also signed to Major League Rugby expansion side Dallas Jackals for the 2021 season, before the team delayed their entry to the league. He made his debut for Samoa in  July 2021, playing two non-cap internationals against the Māori All Blacks, before winning the first cap against Tonga in the 2023 Rugby World Cup qualifiers.

Reference list

External links
 

1995 births
Samoan rugby union players
Samoa international rugby union players
Living people
Rugby union locks
Rugby union flankers
Saracens F.C. players